Njombe Urban District is one of the six districts of the Njombe Region of Tanzania, East Africa. The administrative seat for the district is in the city of Njombe.

History
Njombe Urban District was formally established when it was gazetted in March 2012. It was created out of the south-eastern part of the old Njombe District that had been in Iringa Region. Western Njombe District became Wanging'ombe District, and the northern part became Njombe Rural District.

Economy
Outside of the 50,000 people city of Njombe, most people are employed in herding and subsistence farming.

Challenges facing the economy
Roads are poor and is not proper in heavy vehicle/truck.

Administrative subdivisions

Constituencies
For parliamentary elections, Tanzania is divided into constituencies. As of the 2010 elections the area that became Njombe Urban District had one constituency:
 Njombe Kusini (Njombe South) Constituency

Divisions
Njombe Urban District is administratively divided into divisions.

Wards
As of 2012, Njombe Urban District was administratively divided into fourteen wards:

 Ihanga
 Iwungilo
 Kifanya
 Lugenge
 Luponde
 Lyamkena
 Matola
 Mji Mwema
 Mjimwema (A & B)
 Mlowa
 Mwembetogwa
 Njombe Mjini
 Ramadhani
 Ubena
 Utalingolo
 Uwemba
 Yakobi

Notes

Districts of Njombe Region